Soil solarization is a non-chemical environmentally friendly method for controlling pests using solar power to increase the soil temperature to levels at which many soil-borne plant pathogens will be killed or greatly weakened. Soil solarization is used in warm climates on a relatively small scale in gardens and organic farms. Soil solarization weakens and kills fungi, bacteria, nematodes, and insect and mite pests along with weeds in the soil by mulching the soil and covering it with a tarp, usually with a transparent polyethylene cover to trap solar energy. This energy causes physical, chemical, and biological changes in the soil community. Soil solarization is dependent upon time, temperature, and soil moisture. It may also be described as methods of decontaminating soil or creating suppressive soils by the use of sunlight.

Soil disinfestation
Soil solarization is a hydrothermal process of disinfecting the soil of pests, accomplished by solar power (referred to as solar heating of the soil in early publications) and is relatively a new soil disinfestation method, first described in extensive scientific detail by Katan in 1976. The mode of action for soil solarization is complex and involves the use of heat as a lethal agent for soil pests from the use of transparent polyethylene tarps. To increase the effectiveness of solar heating requires optimal seasonal temperatures, mulching during high temperatures and solar irradiation, and moisture soil conditions. Soil temperatures are lower when decreasing in soil depth and it is necessary to continue the mulching process to control for pathogens. Soil solarization practices requires soil temperatures reach 35-60 degrees Celsius (95 to 140° F), which kills pathogens at the top 30 centimeters of soil. Solarization does not sterilize the soil completely. Soil solarization enhances the soil towards promoting beneficial microorganism. Soil solarization creates a beneficial microbe community by killing up to 90% of pathogens. More specifically, a study reported after eight days of solarization 100% of V. dabliae (a fungus that causes farm crops to wilt and die) was killed at a depth of 25 centimeters. Soil solarization causes a decrease in beneficial microbes, however beneficial bacteria like the Bacillus species are able to survive and flourish under high temperatures in solarized soils. Other studies have also reported an increase in Trichoderma harzianum (fungicide) after solarization. Soil solarization allows for the recolonization of competitive beneficial microbes by creating a favorable environment conditions. The number of beneficial microbes increases over time and makes solarized soils more resistant to pathogens. The success of solarization is not only due to the decrease in soil pathogens, but also to the increase in beneficial microbes such as Bacillus, Pseudomonas, and Talaromyces flavus. Soil solarization has been shown to suppress soil pathogens and cause an increase in plant growth. Suppressed soils promote rhizobacteria and have shown to increase total dry weight in sugar beets by 3.5 times. Also the study showed that plant growth promoting rhizobacteria on sugar beets treated with soil solarization increased root density by 4.7 times. Soil solarization is an important agricultural practice for ecologically friendly soil pathogen suppression.

Soil decontamination 
A 2008 study used a solar cell to generate an electric field for electrokinetic (EK) remediation of cadmium-contaminated soil. The solar cell could drive the electromigration of cadmium in contaminated soil, and the removal efficiency that was achieved by the solar cell was comparable with that achieved by conventional power supply.

In Korea, various remediation methods of soil slurry and groundwater contaminated with benzene at a polluted gas station site were evaluated, including a solar-driven, photocatalyzed reactor system along with various advanced oxidation processes (AOP). The most synergistic remediation method incorporated a solar light process with TiO2 slurry and H2O2 system, achieving 98% benzene degradation, a substantial increase in the removal of benzene.

History 

Attempts were made to use solar energy for controlling disease agents in soil and in plant material already in the ancient civilization of India. In 1939, Groashevoy, who used the term "solar energy for sand disinfection," controlled Thielaviopsis basicola upon heating the sand by exposure to direct sunlight.

Soil solarization is the third approach for soil disinfestation; the two other main approaches, soil steaming and fumigation; were developed at the end of the 19th century. The idea of solarization was based on observations by extension workers and farmers in the hot Jordan Valley, who noticed the intensive heating of the polyethylene-mulched soil. The involvement of biological control mechanisms in pathogen control and the possible implications were indicated in the first publication, noticing the very long effect of the treatment. In 1977, American scientists from the University of California at Davis reported the control of Verticillium in a cotton field, based on studies started in 1976, thus denoting, for the first time, the possible wide applicability of this method.

The use of polyethylene for soil solarization differs in principle from its traditional agricultural use. With solarization, soil is mulched during the hottest months (rather than the coldest, as in conventional plasticulture which is aimed at protecting the crop) in order to increase the maximal temperatures in an attempt to achieve lethal heat levels.

In the first 10 years following the influential 1976 publication, soil solarization was investigated in at least 24 countries and has been now been applied in more than 50, mostly in the hot regions, although there were some important exceptions. Studies have demonstrated effectiveness of solarization with various crops, including vegetables, field crops, ornamentals and fruit trees, against many pathogens, weeds and a soil arthropod. Those pathogens and weeds which are not controlled by solarization were also detected.  The biological, chemical and physical changes that take in solarized soil during and after the solarization have been investigated, as well as the interaction of solarization with other methods of control. Long-term effects including biological control and increased growth response were verified in various climatic regions and soils, demonstrating the general applicability of solarization. 
Computerized simulation models have been developed to guide researchers and growers whether the ambient conditions of their locality are suitable for solarization.

Studies of the improvement of solarization by integrating it with other methods or by solarizing in closed glasshouses, or studies concerning commercial application by developing mulching machines were also carried out.

The use of solarization in existing orchards (e.g. controlling Verticillium in pistachio plantations) is an important deviation from the standard preplanting method and was reported as early as 1979.

References

Further reading

Earth sciences
Soil
Soil improvers